Mount Auburn is a town in Jackson Township, Wayne County, in the U.S. state of Indiana. The population was 117 at the 2010 census. The town is sandwiched between Dublin and Cambridge City.

Geography

Demographics

2010 census
As of the census of 2010, there were 117 people, 49 households, and 31 families living in the town. The racial makeup of the town was 98.3% White, 0.9% Asian, and 0.9% from two or more races.

There were 49 households, of which 36.7% had children under the age of 18 living with them, 46.9% were married couples living together, 14.3% had a female householder with no husband present, 2.0% had a male householder with no wife present, and 36.7% were non-families. 32.7% of all households were made up of individuals, and 14.3% had someone living alone who was 65 years of age or older. The average household size was 2.39 and the average family size was 3.13.

The median age in the town was 37.5 years. 25.6% of residents were under the age of 18; 6.8% were between the ages of 18 and 24; 26.6% were from 25 to 44; 21.3% were from 45 to 64; and 19.7% were 65 years of age or older. The gender makeup of the town was 48.7% male and 51.3% female.

2000 census
As of the census of 2000, there were 75 people, 31 households, and 23 families living in the town. The racial makeup of the town was 100.00% White.

There were 31 households, out of which 29.0% had children under the age of 18 living with them, 74.2% were married couples living together, 3.2% had a female householder with no husband present, and 22.6% were non-families. 19.4% of all households were made up of individuals, and 12.9% had someone living alone who was 65 years of age or older. The average household size was 2.42 and the average family size was 2.79.

In the town, the population was spread out, with 20.0% under the age of 18, 5.3% from 18 to 24, 32.0% from 25 to 44, 18.7% from 45 to 64, and 24.0% who were 65 years of age or older. The median age was 41 years. For every 100 females, there were 108.3 males. For every 100 females age 18 and over, there were 100.0 males.

The median income for a household in the town was $30,313, and the median income for a family was $31,667. Males had a median income of $37,500 versus $28,125 for females. The per capita income for the town was $17,624. There were no families and 3.2% of the population living below the poverty line, including no under eighteens and none of those over 64.

References

Towns in Indiana
Towns in Wayne County, Indiana